Belonophora wernhamii is a species of flowering plant in the family Rubiaceae. It is found in Nigeria and Cameroon.

External links
World Checklist of Rubiaceae

wernhamii